Fatburger North America Inc.  (doing business as Fatburger) is an American fast casual restaurant chain. Its tagline is The Last Great Hamburger Stand. While it is a fast food restaurant, the food is cooked and made to order. Some Fatburger restaurants have liquor licenses as well as "fat bars."  Its franchise headquarters are in Beverly Hills, California. In addition to the United States, the chain operates in 19 other countries. The Fatburger menu is centered primarily on hamburgers, offering various sizes and numbers of patties, along with add-ons such as cheese, bacon and eggs.

History

Fatburger was founded by Lovie Yancey (1912–2008) in the neighborhood of Exposition Park in  Los Angeles, California, in 1947. It was originally named "Mr. Fatburger" (on behalf of Yancey's boyfriend), until Yancey removed the "Mr." in 1952. At that time, she bought out her start-up partners and retained sole ownership of the Fatburger brand until 1990, keeping and operating the original store on Western Avenue along with the La Cienega Boulevard store (La Cienega/San Vicente).

Fatburger remained a mostly California-based chain until the late 1990s, when it began an expansion in North America. On August 15, 2003, Fog Cutter Capital Group completed a $7 million investment and financing package for the company. Fatburger operates or franchises over 150 Fatburger restaurants worldwide with over 300 more planned for future development. For several months in 2006, the company was barred from selling additional franchises in California, due to chairperson Wiederhorn's felony convictions.

In 1992, Fatburger gained national attention after being referenced in the hit song "It Was a Good Day" by rapper and actor Ice Cube. It was also referenced by The Notorious B.I.G. in the song "Going Back to Cali".

In 2008, Fatburger opened its first restaurant in a sports stadium, the Arizona Diamondbacks' Chase Field. Fatburger also opened its first location in Dubai, U.A.E., (today there are eight). There are also Fatburger eateries in Beijing, PR China.

In January 2013, Fatburger opened its first branch in Karachi, Pakistan. Owing to the success of the burgers and positive response in Pakistan, Fatburger opened its biggest flagship outlet globally in June 2013 in Lahore. In July 2015, a branch in Lahore was shut down by authorities due to health and food safety reasons.

Locations
Fatburger has locations in five western states in the United States and Canada, and new locations in China, Saudi Arabia, Bahrain, Malaysia, the United Kingdom, Fiji, Indonesia, Iraq (including Iraqi Kurdistan), India, the United Arab Emirates, Kuwait, Tunisia, Macau, Pakistan, Oman, Panama, Singapore, Philippines, Qatar, and Japan. In some locations, menu changes were made to conform to local customs. It will expand into Texas, in cities like Austin, Dallas, Houston and San Antonio. In 2019, it was announced the first Texas location would be created in North Richland Hills.

Partnerships
Former professional basketball player Magic Johnson, through Johnson Development Corporation, was one of the owners of the parent company. Former talk show host Montel Williams co-owns several Fatburger restaurants in Colorado. Bay Area musician E-40 also had a stake in the company as a franchise owner, by opening the first San Francisco Bay Area Fatburger restaurant in Pleasant Hill, which is now closed. Actor and musician Queen Latifah also at one point partnered with Fatburger.

In 2007, rapper Kanye West's restaurant company, KW Foods LLC, struck a deal to open up to 10 Fatburger restaurants in Chicago. Ultimately, in 2009, only two locations actually opened. In February 2011, West shut down the Fatburger located in Orland Park. Later in 2011 the remaining Beverly location was bought back by the company. R&B musician Pharrell, in partnership with Fatburger, opened several Fatburger restaurants in China in 2007 and 2008.

In popular culture
Fatburger has been featured and/or seen in TV series and movies:

In the 2001 film Rat Race, the Pear family were sitting inside a Fatburger.  Later, Randy Pear buys sleeping pills and puts them in his family's milkshakes.
In the 2016 film Get a Job, Hank Diller is at his desk with food from Fatburger.
On season 1 episode entitled "Tickets for a Queue" of the Apple TV+ series Trying, Jason and Erica are having a meal at Fatburger.

See also
 List of hamburger restaurants

References

External links

Companies based in Beverly Hills, California
Economy of the Southwestern United States
Restaurants in California
Cuisine of the Western United States
Restaurant chains in the United States
1947 establishments in California
Fast-food chains of the United States
Restaurants established in 1947
Companies that filed for Chapter 11 bankruptcy in 2009
Hamburger restaurants
Fast-food franchises
Fast-food hamburger restaurants
Restaurant franchises
Fast casual restaurants